William Garnett may refer to:

 William Garnett (civil servant) (1793–1873), British Inspector-general of Taxes
 William Garnett (politician) (1818–1873), MP for Lancaster, 1857–1864
 William Garnett (photographer) (1916–2006), American landscape photographer
 William Garnett (professor) (1850–1932), British electrical engineer
 William John Garnett (1921–1997), British industrial relations campaigner
 Bill Garnett (born 1960), American basketball player
 William Garnett (cricketer) (1816–1903), English cricketer and clergyman